(1636–1713) was a Japanese painter of the Kanō school. He first studied under his father, Kanō Naonobu, and then his uncle, Kanō Tan'yū, after his father's death.  He became a master painter and succeed his uncle Tan'yū as head of the Kanō school in 1674. It is believed many works attributed to Tan'yū might actually be Tsunenobu, but it is difficult to know since they often worked on larger pieces together.

References

External links
Bridge of dreams: the Mary Griggs Burke collection of Japanese art, a catalog from The Metropolitan Museum of Art Libraries (fully available online as PDF), which contains material on this artist (see index)

Kanō school
1636 births
1713 deaths
17th-century Japanese people
18th-century Japanese people
17th-century Japanese artists
18th-century Japanese artists
17th-century Japanese painters
18th-century Japanese painters